Paul Kunze (25 December 1904 – 16 July 1983) was a Dutch fencer. He competed at three Olympic Games.

References

External links
 

1904 births
1983 deaths
Dutch male fencers
Olympic fencers of the Netherlands
Fencers at the 1924 Summer Olympics
Fencers at the 1928 Summer Olympics
Fencers at the 1936 Summer Olympics
Fencers from Amsterdam
20th-century Dutch people